Lewis Wesley Cutrer (November 5, 1904 – May 7, 1981) served as Mayor of Houston, Texas from 1957–1963.  Among his chief accomplishments while in office were the construction of Houston Intercontinental Airport (now George Bush Intercontinental Airport) and the Lake Livingston development project.

The Houston Airport System named Lewis W. Cutrer Terminal C at George Bush Intercontinental Airport after Cutrer.

References

1904 births
1981 deaths
Mayors of Houston
20th-century American politicians
Texas Democrats